Radio 3 may refer to:
 BBC Radio 3, British radio station
 CBC Radio 3, Canadian radio station
 Rai Radio 3, Italian radio station
 Radio 3 (Spanish radio station) (Radio 3 RNE)

See also
Radyo 3, Turkish radio station